"Kush Ups"  is a song by American rapper Snoop Dogg, and featuring Wiz Khalifa. It was released for digital download on June 7, 2016 as the first single of his studio album Coolaid, with the record labels; Doggystyle Records and eOne Music. It was produced by KJ Conteh.

Production and composition 
The song was written by Snoop Dogg, Wiz Khalifa and produced by KJ Conteh. The song contains a sample of "I Wanna Rock" by Luther Campbell from his album I Got Shit on My Mind.

Music video 
On June 7, 2016 Snoop uploaded the music video for "Kush Ups" on Snoop's official website. The music video was directed by Dan Folger. The video of the single was shot in black-and-white.

Track listing 
Download digital
Kush Ups (featuring Wiz Khalifa) — 3:57

Charts

Weekly charts

Release history

References

2016 singles
2016 songs
Snoop Dogg songs
Wiz Khalifa songs
MNRK Music Group singles
Songs about cannabis
Black-and-white music videos
Songs written by Snoop Dogg
Songs written by Wiz Khalifa